Ligue mahoraise de football is the governing body of association football in Mayotte. It was established in 1979 and is associated with the French Football Federation. The country is not a member of FIFA.

References

Football in Mayotte
Mayotte
1979 establishments in Mayotte